Culver Max Entertainment Private Limited is an Indian media conglomerate owned by Sony Pictures.

Culver Max Entertainment manages and operates 26 television channels, the streaming media platform SonyLIV, as well as the television studio Studio NEXT and film studio Sony Pictures International Productions.

History
It was founded on September 18, 1995 as Sony Entertainment Television India Private Limited (SET India Pvt Ltd.). The first channel from the company was Sony Entertainment Television.

In 1999, SET India Pvt Ltd., launched its second channel Sony Max which broadcast Hindi movies and sports events along with Sony Entertainment Television. In 2005, SET India Network bought SAB TV from Sri Adhikari Brothers and rebranded as Sony SAB.  In 2006 SET India launched the English movie channel Sony Pix.

In December 2007, SET India Private Limited was renamed as Multi Screen Media Private Limited.

In December 2015, the company was renamed as Sony Pictures Networks India (SPN).

On 22 September 2021, Zee Entertainment Enterprises announced that it had reached an agreement in principle to merge its television networks, production operations, digital assets, and program libraries with SPN; the combined company would be majority-owned by Sony, and led by Zee CEO Punit Goenka. On 21 December 2021, the two companies reached a definitive agreement to merge; it was stated that the combined company "should be well-positioned to meet the growing consumer demand for premium content across entertainment touchpoints and platform[s]."

In April 2022, SPN changed its corporate name to Culver Max Entertainment (taking its name and logo from a vanity production company used for the Sony/Marvel animated series The Spectacular Spider-Man); the name is used exclusively by the holding company, with Sony Pictures Networks continuing to be used as the consumer-facing brand.

On 24 October 2022, nearly all of Sony's networks underwent a rebranding coinciding with Diwali, replacing the cropped "S" logo used by SET since its launch with the S-curve logo template used by Sony's television networks worldwide since 2019, and first used locally by SonyLIV.

Sports

The network forayed into the Indian sports TV market in 2002 after acquiring the licence rights for International Cricket Council (ICC) matches from 2002 to 2007, which were broadcast on SET and Sony MAX. In 2008, along with Singapore-based World Sport Group, it won the broadcast rights for the IPL for 10 years. In April 2012, it launched its first sports channel Sony SIX. In August 2016, SPN acquired the TEN Sports networks from Zee Entertainment Enterprises for $385 million, with the networks rebranded in 2017 under the "Sony TEN" brand, and integrated with Sony Six and Sony ESPN.

General entertainment
In the widespread entertainment category, Sony Entertainment Television (SET) and Sony SAB are the network's premier channels. Offering content from SET and Sony SAB is Sony Pal, a channel targeted towards rural Hindi-speaking markets. Sony YAY! is a kids’ entertainment channel that airs several shows in regional languages.

The network also has a joint venture with BBC Earth to showcase non-fictional programming via Sony BBC Earth. Sony Aath is a premium Bangla entertainment channel centered on showcasing series, films, animated shows and sports events produced or dubbed in Bengali. Sony Marathi is a Marathi channel aimed at the Maharashtra audience.

Owned channels

On air channels

Defunct channels

Streaming platform 

In January 2013, the network forayed into video-on-demand with the launch of its OTT platform, SonyLIV. Its library consists of content from the network's channels in India such as SET and Sony SAB, alongside originals such as, Gullak, LIV Shout Out and Holycross. Apart from archival and regional content, movie premieres, short films and LIVE sports are also a part of SonyLIV's offerings.

The platform has crossed 109 million app downloads.

Movies 
Sony Max and Sony Max 2 offer Hindi cinema to viewers. Sony MAX showcases world premieres, while Sony MAX HD focuses to Indian viewers who prefer a high definition viewing experience. Sony MAX 2 caters to viewers who appreciate evergreen Indian cinema.

Alongside these, the network offers Sony Pix basing its programming on Hollywood films and Sony WAH, which was a Free To Air movie channel but recently switched back as a paid channel.

Sony Pictures International Productions 
Set up in 2013, Sony Pictures International Productions (SPIP) is the film production arm of the network. It produces cinema for Indian diaspora audiences worldwide. Since 2015, SPIP has produced and distributed films such as 
Bajatey Raho
Darr @ the Mall
Youngistaan
Piku
Chalk n Duster
Azhar
Maacher Jhol 
Mubarakan
Poster Boys
Padman
102 Not Out
Soorma
Bombairiya
Ghoomketu 
Shakuntala Devi
Helmet
Dial 100
Looop Lapeta
Major
Nikamma
The upcoming films from SPIP include Maaveeran, Shaktimaan, Kaash Aisa Hota, Aankh Micholi, Advait, Dive and among others.

Studio NEXT 
An independent business unit of SPNI, Studio NEXT creates original content and IPs for television and digital media within India and globally. The venture began its journey by producing the debutant season of Kus Bani Koshur Karorpaet, the Kashmiri adaptation of Who Wants to Be a Millionaire? but like other vernacular Indian adaptations, structured more in line with Indian flagship, national adaptation in Kaun Banega Crorepati. Going forward, Studio NEXT will continue to produce new IPs whilst leveraging the existing ones under Sony Entertainment ownership.

Corporate social responsibility 
'Ek India Happywala' is the call-to-action under which the network guides its contribution towards society. To create change in society, it focuses on 3 impact areas - Environment, Education and Empowerment.

The network associates itself with several NGOs such as Krida Vikas Sanstha, Cricket Association for the Blind of Maharashtra (CABM) and ConnectEd Technologies to name a few, and undertakes initiatives such as providing clean drinking water to drought-affected areas in Maharashtra and supporting upcoming Indian athletes with equipment and training required to compete at international events among a few.

International presence and distribution reach 
SPNI reaches out to over 700M viewers across India and is available in 167 countries.

See also
 Sony India
 Sony Sports Network
 Sony Pictures
 Sony Pictures Television
 Sony

Notes and references

 
Television broadcasting companies of India
Mass media companies based in Mumbai
Indian companies established in 1995
Mass media companies established in 1995
Indian subsidiaries of foreign companies
1995 establishments in Maharashtra
Television networks in India